Nicolas Wimmer (born 15 March 1995) is an Austrian professional footballer who plays as a centre-back for Austria Klagenfurt.

Career
Wimmer is a product of the youth academies of Union Pichling, LASK and Ried. He began his senior career with ASKÖ Donau Linz in 2012 in the Austrian fourth division. After 91 appearances there, he transferred to Vorwärts Steyr and helped them gain promotion to the 2. Liga. He made his professional debut with Vorwärts Steyr in a 1–1 2. Liga tie with SV Ried on 27 July 2018. On 8 February 2021, he transferred to Blau-Weiß Linz. He helped them win the 2. Liga, and was named as part of the league's team of the season. He transferred to Austria Klagenfurt on 30 June 2021, signing a 3-year contract.

References

External links
 
 OEFB Profile

1995 births
Living people
Austrian footballers
SK Austria Klagenfurt players
SK Vorwärts Steyr players
FC Blau-Weiß Linz players
Austrian Football Bundesliga players
2. Liga (Austria) players
Austrian Regionalliga players
Association football defenders